Phyo Un-suk (born 13 June 1981) is a North Korean long-distance runner who specializes in the marathon. Her personal best time is 2:28:34 hours, achieved at the 2009 Pyongyang Marathon.

She finished eighth in the half marathon at the 2003 Summer Universiade, and won the 2008 and 2009 Pyongyang Marathon.

Achievements

References

1981 births
Living people
North Korean female marathon runners